Hannah Ludwig (born 15 February 2000) is a German professional racing cyclist, who currently rides for UCI Women's WorldTeam .

Major results
2017
 2nd Time trial, National Junior Road Championships
 4th Time trial, UCI World Junior Road Championships
 5th Time trial, UEC European Junior Road Championships
 10th Overall Healthy Ageing Tour Juniors
2018
 1st  Time trial, National Junior Road Championships
 UEC European Junior Road Championships
2nd Time trial
3rd Road race
 3rd Overall EPZ Omloop van Borsele
 10th Time trial, UCI WorldJunior Road Championships
2019
 1st  Time trial, UEC European Under–23 Road Championships
 4th Time trial, National Road Championships
 6th Overall BeNe Ladies Tour
1st  Young rider classification
2020
 1st  Time trial, UEC European Under–23 Road Championships
 9th Trophée des Grimpeuses
2021
 2nd  Time trial, UEC European Under–23 Road Championships
 6th Overall Setmana Ciclista Valenciana

References

External links

2000 births
Living people
German female cyclists
Place of birth missing (living people)
European Games competitors for Germany
Cyclists at the 2019 European Games
Olympic cyclists of Germany
Cyclists at the 2020 Summer Olympics
Sportspeople from Heidelberg
Cyclists from Baden-Württemberg
21st-century German women